Vesper is a genus of flowering plants belonging to the family Apiaceae.

Its native range is western and central USA to north-western Mexico. It is found in the states of Arizona, California, Colorado, Idaho, Kansas, Nebraska, Nevada, New Mexico, Oklahoma, Oregon, South Dakota, Texas, Utah and Wyoming.

Taxonomy
The genus was circumscribed by Ronald Lee Hartmann and Guy L. Nesom in Phytoneuron 2012-94 on page 2 in 2012. 

The genus name of Vesper is derived from Fengjie Sun (b. 1968) and Stephen Roy Downie (b. 1959), 2 American botanists and evolutionary biologists in Georgia. Their surnames combined are (Sun-down) and Vespers are prayers at sundown.

Species
As accepted by Kew;
Vesper bulbosus 
Vesper constancei 
Vesper macrorhizus 
Vesper montanus 
Vesper multinervatus 
Vesper purpurascens

References

Apiaceae
Apiaceae genera
Flora of the Northwestern United States
Flora of the Southwestern United States
Flora of the South-Central United States
Flora of Northwestern Mexico